William Plomer (fl. 1382–1390), of Great Bedwyn, Wiltshire, was an English politician.

He was a Member (MP) of the Parliament of England for Great Bedwyn in May 1382, October 1382, October 1383, November 1384, 1385 and January 1390.

References

Year of birth missing
Year of death missing
English MPs May 1382
People from Wiltshire
Members of Parliament for Great Bedwyn
English MPs October 1382
English MPs October 1383
English MPs November 1384
English MPs 1385
English MPs January 1390